Taoufik Hicheri (born 8 January 1965) is a Tunisian former footballer. He played in 55 matches for the Tunisia national football team from 1989 to 1998. He was also named in Tunisia's squad for the 1998 African Cup of Nations tournament.

References

External links
 

1965 births
Living people
Tunisian footballers
Tunisia international footballers
Association football defenders
1994 African Cup of Nations players
1998 African Cup of Nations players
Espérance Sportive de Tunis players
Vitória S.C. players
CS M'saken players
Tunisian Ligue Professionnelle 1 players
Primeira Liga players
Tunisian expatriate footballers
Tunisian expatriate sportspeople in Portugal
Expatriate footballers in Portugal
Footballers from Tunis
Tunisia A' international footballers
2011 African Nations Championship players